A Life Too Short: The Tragedy of Robert Enke is a 2010 biography by Ronald Reng about the Hannover 96 captain and Germany Goalkeeper Robert Enke, who died by suicide  after six years of depression on 10 November 2009.

Synopsis
The book details the life of Robert Enke, particularly focusing on Enke's struggle with depression. Reng also focuses on his friendship with Enke, with whom he was supposed to co-write a biography.

Reception
Critical reception for A Life Too Short has been positive, with the book receiving the 2011 William Hill Sports Book of the Year Award. The Guardian praised A Life too Short as "eloquent and sensitive", and William Hill co-founder Graham Sharpe stated it was "an outstanding piece of sportswriting".

References

2010 non-fiction books
German biographies
Association football books
William Hill Sports Book of the Year winning works
Random House books